The Forfar and Kincardine Artillery was a British artillery militia regiment of the 19th century.  It was based in and named after Forfarshire and Kincardineshire in Scotland.

Following the Militia Act of 1797, the regiment was raised as an infantry regiment in 1798 as the Forfarshire Militia.  Four years later its territorial scope was broadened when it became the Forfarshire and Kincardine Militia and in 1854 it was converted to a Militia Artillery unit and redesignated the Forfar and Kincardine Artillery.

In 1815, the regiment was serving in Ireland; Colonel Hon. A. Douglas, Lt. Colonel Hon. C. Douglas.

By 1882 the regiment became the 5th Brigade, Scottish Division, Royal Artillery, by which time it had a total of eight batteries and over 800 men. It became the Forfar & Kincardine Artillery (Southern Division) in 1889. In 1899 the artillery militia were incorporated into the Royal Garrison Artillery and on 1 January 1902 it was renamed  the Forfar and Kincardine Royal Garrison Artillery (Militia). On the creation of the Territorial Force in 1908 the unit was transferred to the Special Reserve Royal Field Artillery. It was disbanded in 1909.

References

Publications

 Litchfield, Norman E H, 1987.  The Militia Artillery 1852-1909, The Sherwood Press, Nottingham. 

Scottish regiments
Military units and formations established in 1798
Militia regiments of the Royal Artillery
1909 disestablishments in Scotland
1798 establishments in Scotland
Military units and formations disestablished in 1909